The Boston College Eagles college football team competes as part of the National Collegiate Athletic Association (NCAA) Division I Football Bowl Subdivision, representing Boston College in the Atlantic Division of the Atlantic Coast Conference (ACC). Boston College has played their home games at Alumni Stadium in Chestnut Hill, Massachusetts since 1957.  Boston College claims one national championship in 1940, though the NCAA doesn't recognize it, and have played in 22 Bowl Games, winning 13. With 626 wins over 120 seasons of football, Boston College ranks 51st all-time in win–loss records in the NCAA. Boston College played as an Independent until joining the Big East Conference in 1991. Boston College later joined the Atlantic Coast Conference in 2005.

Seasons

References

 
Boston College
Boston College Eagles football seasons